Hannu Kankkonen (26 January 1934 – 23 September 2013) was a Finnish footballer. He played in 23 matches for the Finland national football team from 1954 to 1964.

References

1934 births
2013 deaths
Finnish footballers
Finland international footballers
Place of birth missing
Association footballers not categorized by position